The great sand eel (Hyperoplus lanceolatus) is the greater species of sand eel.

Description
The great sand eel has an elongated body, with a rounded cross section. It has a long, pointed head, and a protruding lower jaw. Its upper jaw, however, is not protrusible, and this species is unable to form a tube with its mouth. A monocle "tooth-shaped" structure can be found at the front of the palate. The scales on the body cannot form a chevron pattern. The skin ridge running the length of the sides of the body, spread as far as one-third of the base of the anal fin. Low and long set dorsal fins consist of 52 to 61 rays. The anal fin is about half the size of the dorsal fin, and taller. The pectoral fins are diminutive; the pelvic fins are absent. Color ranges from a lime color on the back and upper sides to the bright silver on the lower sides and the belly. Also, a specific black smudge occurs between the eyes and the snout, which is about the same size as the diameter of the eye.

The great sand eel can be distinguished from the lesser sand eel because the origin of its long dorsal fin is located behind the level of the pectoral fin. Corbin's sand eel (Hyperoplus immaculatus) is very similar to the greater sand eel in the way that it lacks a protrusible upper jaw and its similar size. However, it can be distinguished by the lack of the black spot on the snout, but it does have a black chin. Its dorsal fin has 59 to 62 rays. The overall color is darker than the other sand eels, it is found offshore, and tends to be found more on the western side of the United Kingdom

Biology
Breeding occurs between March and August. It feeds on plankton, fish larvae, and a vast range of crustaceans.

Distribution and habitat
The great sand eel is native to the eastern North Atlantic from Murmansk (70°N) and Spitzbergen (75°N) southwards to Portugal (38°N) including Iceland and the Baltic Sea. It has not been recorded from the Mediterranean Sea or the Barents Sea. 

Ecology
Sand eels form an important part of the diet of many sea birds. Excessive fishing of sand eels on an industrial scale in the North Sea has been linked to a decline in the breeding success of kittiwakes, terns, fulmars, and shags.

References

External links
 Pictures of the Greater Sand-eel
 Larger Overview
 Scottish Records
 Isle of Man-Fishing
 Weight

great sand eel
Fish of the North Sea
Fish of the Baltic Sea
great sand eel